This is a list of notable engineers in Nigeria arranged in alphabetical order.

A
Akinsola Olusegun Faluyi (Born, 13 November 1934) is a Nigerian Mechanical engineer and former President of the Council for the Regulation of Engineering (COREN) in Nigeria.
Abubakar Sani Sambo, Officer of the Order of the Niger, OON (Born 31 July 1955) is a Nigerian Mechanical engineer, incumbent Director-General of the Energy Commission of Nigeria (ECN)
Mayen Adetiba (born 1954) is a Nigerian actor who went on to be a leading civil engineer.
Ahmad Salihijo Ahmad is a Nigerian Engineer
Godman Akinlabi is a Nigerian pastor, author, public speaker and engineer.
Deji Akinwande Professor of Electrical and Computer Engineering 
Demola Aladekomo  is a Computer Engineer 
Bolaji Aluko  a Professor of Chemical Engineering
Edet Amana  (born December 11, 1938) is a Nigerian engineer.
Idiat Amusu  female agricultural engineer in Nigeria
Aderemi Aaron-Anthony Atayero
Ifedayo Akintunde, Nigerian engineer, first African to win the WFEO Medal of Engineering Excellence. Distinguished Fellow of the Nigerian Society of Engineers (NSE), and former President of the society.

B 

Babalola Borishade  an electrical engineer,
Maikanti Baru
Olufemi Bamiro  Professor of Mechanical Engineering
Rahmon Ade Bello s a Nigerian professor of Chemical engineering, educational administrator and former vice chancellor of the University of Lagos, Nigeria

D
Danladi Slim Matawal, (Born 30  October 1955) is a Nigerian professor of Civil engineering and the  Director-General of the Nigerian Building and Road Research Institute (NBRRI)
John Dabiri a Nigerian-American aeronautics engineer

E
Ebele Ofunneamaka Okeke (14 June 1948) is a Nigerian civil engineer and former Head of Nigerian Civil Service
Edet James Amana (11 December 1938) is a Nigerian Civil engineer and former President of the Nigerian Academy of Engineering
Ernest Ndukwe,  Officer of the order of Niger (Born 2 September 1948) is a Nigerian Electrical engineer and former Chief Executive Officer of the Nigerian Communications Commission, NCC
Eli Jidere Bala (Born 19 September 1954) is a Nigerian professor of Mechanical engineering and the Director-General of the Energy Commission of Nigeria (ECN)
Philip Emeagwali (born 23 August 1954) is a Nigerian computer scientist.

F
Franklin Erepamo Osaisai (Born 1 October 1958),  Former  Director-General and Chief Executive Officer of the Nigeria Atomic Energy Commission.
Seun Fakorede

G 
Umar Garba, CEO/EVC Nigerian Communications Commission, electronic engineering

H 
Femi Hamzat

I 
Ibrahim Khaleel Inuwa (born 15 April 1949. Kano State). Mechanical Engineer. Past President NSE, Past President COREN, Past Deputy President NIM.
Ilondu Chiedozie Oliver (born 20 July 1982) is a Petroleum Engineer from Anambra State. Member of NSE and registered Engineer with COREN.

J
Joseph Atubokiki Ajienka (born 10 January 1955, Rivers State, Nigeria) is a Nigerian professor of Petroleum engineering

K
Ahmadu Musa Kida is a Nigerian engineer and former basketball player

L
Lawrence Oluwawemimo Arokodare (born 15 March 1938 at Ijero Ekiti, Ekiti State, Nigeria and died on 26 March 1993 in Ibadan, Oyo State, Nigeria) was a Nigeria
Micheal Oladimeji Faborede (Born September 1956), Professor of Agricultural Engineering

M
Salihu Mustafa

N
Nicholas Agiobi Damachi, Officer of the Order of the Niger, OON

O
Oyewusi Ibidapo Obe (Born July, 1951) is a Nigerian professor of System engineering
Ogbonnaya Onu (born 1 December 1951) is a Chemical engineer and the first Executive Governor of Abia State
Olawale Adeniji Ige Member of the Order of the Federal Republic, MFR (Born 13 October 1938) is a Nigerian Electrical engineer and former Minister of the Federal Ministry of  Communications (1990-1992)
Chris Ogiemwonyi
Adeola Olubamiji Nigerian-Canadian Technologist
Babatunde Ogunnaike an American chemical engineer of Nigerian descent 
Soni Oyekan is a Nigerian-American chemical engineer,

P
Azikiwe Peter Onwualu (27 April 1959) is a professor of Agricultural engineering

R
Rahmon Ade Bello (Born, October 1948) is a Nigerian professor of Chemical engineering

S
Samuel Olatunde Fadahunsi OFR, CON (March 1920 - August 2014) was a Nigerian Civil engineer and former President of the Council for the Regulation of Engineering in Nigeria (COREN)
Hauwa Muhammed Sadique is a Nigerian engineer 
Ah
Olatokunbo Somolu is a Nigerian structural engineer
Igho Sanomi  is a Nigerian businessman, geologist,

U
Umar Buba Bindir (Born 11 August 1961) is a Nigerian Agricultural engineer and incumbent Director-General of the National Office for Technology Acquisition (Notap).

Y 
Andrew Yakubu

See also
List of vice chancellors in Nigeria
Nigerian Academy of Engineering

References

 

Engineers